Amazing Heroes was a magazine about the comic book medium published by American company Fantagraphics Books from 1981 to 1992. Unlike its companion title, The Comics Journal, Amazing Heroes was a hobbyist magazine rather than an analytical journal.

Publication history 
Fantagraphics decided to publish Amazing Heroes as another income stream to supplement The Comics Journal. As long-time Fantagraphics co-publisher Kim Thompson put it: "If you want to look at it cynically, we set out to steal The Comic Reader's cheese. Which we did."

Amazing Heroes' first editor was Fantagraphics' head of promotion and circulation, Michael Catron. His inability to meet deadlines led to his being replaced after issue #6 by Comics Journal editor Kim Thompson.

The magazine was initially published under the Fantagraphics imprint Zam, Inc., through issue #6. Beginning with #7, the publishing imprint became Redbeard, Inc. It remained under Redbeard through at least issue #61, but by issue #68 was being published directly by Fantagraphics Books, Inc.

The magazine began as a monthly, then appeared twice a month for many years, and then went monthly again beginning in 1989. The magazine ran for 204 issues, folding with its July 1992 issue. It also released a number of special issues. The final issue was released as a double number, issue #203/204.

In February 1993, Fantagraphics announced that the publisher Personality Comics had bought the rights to Amazing Heroes, and planned to revive the magazine. Nothing came of it, however, as Personality itself folded later that year, and by 1994 the rights had reverted back to Fantagraphics.

Format and content 
Amazing Heroes' first 13 issues were magazine-sized, while the rest were comic book-sized.

The regular content included industry news, comics creator interviews, histories of comic book characters and reviews. Features included Hero Histories of various characters/features, previews of upcoming series, and letters page. Other regular features were a column called "Doc's Bookshelf" by Dwight Decker (which ran from 1987–1989), and a question-and-answer feature called "Information Center", which ran from 1986–1989.

There were regular special editions for previews of upcoming comics, and "swimsuit editions" in which various comics artists drew pin-ups of characters in bikinis and similar beach apparel. The Amazing Heroes Preview Special appeared twice a year (beginning with the Summer 1985 issue), presenting previews of all comics slated to appear over the next six months. These were extra-sized issues, and were often square-bound. Many issues of the AHPS also contained joke entries. The editors fluctuated between publishing these as separately numbered specials and special issues of the regular series itself.

The Amazing Heroes Swimsuit Special debuted with a June 1990 edition.

Amazing Heroes #200 (Apr. 1992) contained an extended preview of Scott McCloud's Understanding Comics; the issue was later awarded a Don Thompson Award for Best Non-Fiction Work.

The Jack Kirby Award 
From 1985 to 1987, the magazine presented The Jack Kirby Award for achievement in comic books, voted on by comic-book professionals and managed by Amazing Heroes managing editor Dave Olbrich. After a dispute in 1987 over who owned them, the Kirby Awards were discontinued. Starting in 1988, the Kirby Award was discontinued and two new awards were created: the Eisner Award, managed by Olbrich, and the Fantagraphics-managed Harvey Award.

Awards 
Amazing Heroes won the U.K.'s Eagle Award for Favourite Specialist Comics Publication four years in a row, from 1985 to 1988: 
 1985:  Eagle Award — Favourite Speciality Comics Publication
 1986: Eagle Award — Favourite Specialist Comics Publication
 1987: Eagle Award — Favourite Specialist Comics Publication
 1988: Eagle Award — Favourite Specialist Comics Publication
 1992: Compuserve Comics and Animation Forum Award — Best Non-Fiction Work

See also
 The Comic Reader

Notes

References
 Bethke, Marilyn. "The New Kids on the Block," The Comics Journal #70, January 1982, pp. 110–111.
 Ringgenberg, Steve, editor. The Best of Amazing Heroes #1 (Redbeard, Inc., 1982).
 Spurgeon, Tom with Michael Dean. "'Everything Was in Season': Fantagraphics from 1978–1984: Amazing Heroes," The Comics Journal (DEC. 08, 2016).

Biweekly magazines published in the United States
Defunct magazines published in the United States
Fantagraphics titles
Hobby magazines published in the United States
Magazines about comics
Magazines established in 1981
Magazines disestablished in 1992
Magazines published in Connecticut
Magazines published in Los Angeles
Magazines published in Seattle
Mass media in Stamford, Connecticut
Monthly magazines published in the United States